The thirteenth season of Polish singing competition The Voice of Poland began airing on September 3, 2022, on TVP 2. It is airing on Saturdays at 20:00. Tomson and Baron, Justyna Steczkowska and Marek Piekarczyk returned to the show for their eleventh, fifth and sixth season, respectively. Lanberry made her first appearance as a coach this season, replacing Sylwia Grzeszczak.

Dominik Dudek won the season, marking Tomson & Baron's second win as a coach.

Panelists 
On June 19, 2022, Justyna Steczkowska confirmed that she would return as a coach in the thirteenth season. On August 7, 2022, it was announced that Tomson and Baron, Marek Piekarczyk and new coach Lanberry would join Justyna Steczkowska as coaches this season. Lanberry replaced Sylwia Grzeszczak, who was a coach in the twelfth season and exited the panel.

Tomasz Kammel, Małgorzata Tomaszewska and Aleksander Sikora returned to the show as hosts for their twelfth, third and second season, respectively.

Teams

Blind auditions 
The show began with the Blind Auditions on September 3, 2022. In each audition, an artist sings their piece in front of the coaches whose chairs are facing the audience. If a coach is interested to work with the artist, they will press their button to face the artist. If a singular coach presses the button, the artist automatically becomes part of their team. If multiple coaches turn, they will compete for the artist, who will decide which team they will join. Each coach has two "blocks" to prevent another coach from getting an artist. Each coach ends up with 12 artists by the end of the blind auditions, creating a total of 48 artists advancing to the battles.

The battles began airing on October 1, 2022. In this round, the coaches pick two of their artists in a singing match and then select one of them to advance to the next round. Losing artists may be "stolen" by another coach, becoming new members of their team. Multiple coaches can attempt to steal an artist, resulting in a competition for the artist, who will ultimately decide which team they will go to. At the end of this round, seven artists will remain on each team; six will be battle winners, and one from a steal. In total, 28 artists advance to the knockouts.

Battles round 

The battles began airing on October 1, 2022. In this round, the coaches pick two of their artists in a singing match and then select one of them to advance to the next round. Losing artists may be "stolen" by another coach, becoming new members of their team. Multiple coaches can attempt to steal an artist, resulting in a competition for the artist, who will ultimately decide which team they will go to. At the end of this round, seven artists will remain on each team; six will be battle winners, and one from a steal. In total, 24 artists advance to the knockouts.

Knockout round 

The Knockout round will premiere on October 22, 2022. During this stage, all contestants have to sing - the first four from each team are automatically put in the hot seats, and after subsequent performances of the remaining three, the coach decides whether a given contestant stays in the show or not. In the end, four contestants from each team qualify for the live episodes.

Live shows 
The Live shows began on October 29, 2022. When the teams consist of four contestants, the coach chooses from among the two contestants with the fewest votes from the viewers (who decide by sending text messages) the person who drops out of the program. Each live episode ends with the elimination of one person from each group. In the semi-final (when the team is made up of two people), each coach divides 100 points to their artists in any way they want. The same happens with the viewers' votes, and the artist with the most points added passes through to the Final.

Week 1: Live round (October 29)

Week 2: Live round (November 5)

Week 3: Semifinal (November 12, 2022)

Week 4: Final (November 19, 2022)

Results summary of live shows

Color key 
Artist's info

  Artist from Team Tomson & Baron
  Artist from Team Lanberry
  Artist from Team Justyna
  Artist from Team Marek

Result details

  Winner
  Runner-up
  Third place
  Fourth place
  Advanced to the finale with the most points
  Saved by his/her coach
  Saved by the public
  Eliminated

Overall

Per team

References

The Voice of Poland